Grampound in Cornwall, was a borough constituency of the House of Commons of the Parliament of England, then of the Parliament of Great Britain from 1707 to 1800 and of the Parliament of the United Kingdom from 1801 to 1821. It was represented by two Members of Parliament.

History
Grampound's market was on a Saturday and the town had a glove factory. Grampound was created a Borough by a charter of King Edward VI with a Mayor, eight Aldermen, a Recorder, and a Town Clerk. In 1547 it sent members to Parliament for the first time, one of a number of rotten boroughs in Cornwall established during the Tudor period.

Boundaries
The constituency was a Parliamentary borough in Cornwall, covering Grampound, a market town  from Truro on the River Fal.

Franchise
The franchise for the borough was in the hands of Mayor, Recorder, Aldermen and any Freemen created by the council. In 1816, T. H. B. Oldfield wrote that there were 42 voters in all. Given that the borough had 80 houses, this meant that the franchise was extended well into the working class.

While several patrons (including the Earls of Mount Edgcumbe, Lord Eliot, Sir Christopher Hawkins and Basil Cochrane) attempted to exert their influence over the choice of members to serve Grampound, the electors were more interested in the monetary value of their vote. Oldfield wrote "The freemen of this borough have been known to boast of receiving three hundred guineas a man for their votes at one election." The voters were used to getting regular payments through the year and received special payments for events like sickness and funerals, with one historian comparing the arrangement to "general free insurance". So notorious and unmanageable did the borough become that Grampound became a byword for electoral corruption, and Edward Porritt noted its use was continuing in 1903.

Disfranchisement for corruption
Finally, after the return of two members in the 1818 general election was overturned by a petition alleging gross bribery, Lord John Russell moved to disfranchise Grampound and to transfer the two members to a new Parliamentary Borough of Leeds. The usual treatment for a Borough which had perpetual bribery (as practiced in New Shoreham in 1770, Cricklade in 1782, Aylesbury in 1804 and East Retford in 1828) was to expand its boundaries and franchise into an area free of corruption but that was not possible in Grampound where the neighbouring towns were also Parliamentary boroughs and increasing the electorate would simply increase the pool of potential bribed voters.

After a delay caused by the accession of King George IV and the scandal of Queen Caroline's return and the Pains and Penalties Bill, Russell introduced a Bill in January 1821. The suggestion of Leeds as a new borough met with resistance because of the large number of working class voters who would be enfranchised, and when an amendment to raise the qualification was passed, Russell withdrew his Bill; however, the mover of the amendment introduced his own. The House of Lords amended the Bill to give the two members instead to the county of Yorkshire, an amendment accepted and which eventually went into law. Grampound was disfranchised by 1 & 2 Geo. IV, c. 47.

Members of Parliament

1547–1629

1640–1821

Constituency disenfranchised for corruption (1821)

Elections

As with most boroughs in the unreformed House of Commons, Grampound was uncontested at most elections. The only contested elections after 1660 were:

 1741: The sitting members, Thomas Hales and Thomas Trefusis, (who were supporters of Robert Walpole) were challenged by Daniel Boone and William Banks. Hales and Trefusis were supported by Richard Edgcumbe who was managing the Cornish Boroughs for the Government and controlled the Grampound corporation, but Boone and Banks arranged for an alternate Mayor to be elected and indemnified the Sheriff of the County against any legal expenses if he delivered the writs for the election to their Mayor and was sued. They secured their election by 27 votes to 23, while an alternative poll by the original Mayor returned Hales and Trefusis with 35 votes to 17 for their opponents. However, Hales and Trefusis declined to press their challenge through an election petition.

 1754: Sir John St Aubyn, Bt and Francis Beauchamp were proposed as candidates apparently without their knowledge by local malcontent voters who wanted to raise the level of their bribery. They secured 13 votes to 31 for Merrick Burrell and Simon Fanshawe, who were government candidates.

Election declared void, 7 March 1808
 1808: Robert Williams (1767–1847) and John Teed 14; George Cochrane and William Holmes 13 by first returning officer. Cochrane and Holmes 27; Williams and Teed 14 by second returning officer. Williams and Teed seated on petition, 10 May 1808.

Andrew Cochrane-Johnstone expelled for committing stock fraud

See also

 List of former United Kingdom Parliament constituencies

Notes

References
 "Representative History of Great Britain and Ireland" by Thomas Hinton Burley Oldfield (Baldwin, Cradock and Joy, London, 1816)
 "Return of Members of Parliament" (1878)
 "The Unreformed House of Commons by Edward Porritt (Cambridge University Press, 1903)
 "Members of the Long Parliament" by D. Brunton and D. H. Pennington (George Allen and Unwin, 1954)
 "The Parliaments of England from 1715 to 1847" by Henry Stooks Smith (2nd edition, edited by F. W. S Craig – Chichester: Parliamentary Reference Publications, 1973)
 
[https://web.archive.org/web/20150904125310/http://www2.odl.ox.ac.uk/gsdl/cgi-bin/library?e=p-000-00---0modhis06--00-0-0-0prompt-10---4------0-1l--1-en-50---20-about---00001-001-1-1isoZz-8859Zz-1-0&a=d&cl=CL1 Cobbett's Parliamentary history of England, from the Norman Conquest in 1066 to the year 1803] (London: Thomas Hansard, 1808)
 Maija Jansson (ed.), Proceedings in Parliament, 1614 (House of Commons) (Philadelphia: American Philosophical Society, 1988)
 

Constituencies of the Parliament of the United Kingdom established in 1553
1821 disestablishments
Parliamentary constituencies disenfranchised for corruption
Parliamentary constituencies in Cornwall (historic)
Rotten boroughs
Constituencies of the Parliament of the United Kingdom disestablished in 1821